"Don't Wait Up" is a song by Colombian singer and songwriter Shakira. It was released on 16 July 2021 via Sony Music Latin in partnership with RCA Records. The song marked Shakira's first completely English single since 2016's "Try Everything".

Background and release
Shakira initially announced that a single accompanied with a video would be released in July 2021, in the cover story of the July edition of Vogue Mexico. The singer first teased the single on 12 July, on her social media by changing her profile pictures to a summery color palette, the change resulted in the hashtag "Shakira is coming" to trend worldwide on Twitter. Upon the announcement along with the hashtag Shakira's name immediately started trending on Twitter's worldwide trends. On 13 July, the artist shared a 30-second video of what could potentially be the name and part of the lyrics of her future track. Later the same day Shakira revealed the cover artwork and its title.

Music video
The music video for the song was released on 16 July 2021. Directed by Warren Fu, it was filmed on the Spanish island of Tenerife in June 2021.

Credits and personnel
Credits adapted from Tidal.
 Shakira – vocals, songwriting, production
 Ian Kirkpatrick – songwriting, production, engineering, recording
 Emily Warren – songwriting, vocal production
 Adam Ayan – mastering
 Dave Clauss – mixing, engineering, recording, vocal production
 Josh Gudwin – mixing
 Andros Rodriguez – engineering, recording
 Roger Rodés – engineering, recording

Charts

Weekly charts

Year-end charts

Certifications

References

2021 singles
2021 songs
Music videos shot in Spain
Songs written by Shakira
Songs written by Emily Warren
Songs written by Ian Kirkpatrick (record producer)
Song recordings produced by Ian Kirkpatrick (record producer)
Shakira songs
Music videos directed by Warren Fu